Lialehkal, also rendered as Lialekal may refer to:
 Lialehkal-e Bala
 Lialehkal-e Pain